Tragic Theater is a 2015 Filipino supernatural horror film based on the book of the same name written by G.M. Coronel, starring Andi Eigenmann, Christopher De Leon and John Estrada. It was released on January 8, 2015, by Viva Films.

Plot 
Many years ago, a group of construction workers were building a theater when the ceiling collapsed; many survived, but more than a hundred men died when the ceiling fell upon them. They were buried beneath the theater.

Annie (Andi Eigenmann), an engineer, wants to consult a group of exorcists and spirit mediums led by a priest (John Estrada) to help her gather information about an old theater with a dark past before she starts her project there.

But things got worse when she left the circle and is now being possessed by a demon.

Cast 
 Andi Eigenmann - Annie Francisco
 Christopher de Leon - Miguel Sanchez Agcaoili	
 John Estrada - Fr. Nilo Marcelo
 Lander Vera-Perez - Annie's Father	
 Janna Victoria - Annie's Aunt		
 Gabe Mercado - Erwin Manabat
 Roxanne Barcelo - Arlene de Lara		
 Josh Padilla - Norman Abalos	
 Chloe Dauden - Teresa Manalad		
 Jovic Monsod - Mick Toledo	
 Sara Polverini - Lana Cristobal	
 Jourdaine Castillo - Joanna	
 Sheng Belmonte - Kate Celis 	
 Carissa Quintas - Armie Ronquillo	
 Janna Roque - Ruth Rivera	
 Arvic Rivero - Marlo Orlindo	
 Pio Balbuena - Nanding Jabinal	
 Clint Bondad - Gil Sanlo 		
 Orlando Sol - Samuel Indanan	
 Gabriel de Leon - Elden Almario

See also
 List of ghost films

References

External links 
 

2015 films
Philippine horror films
Philippine supernatural horror films
2015 horror films
Viva Films films
2010s Tagalog-language films
2010s English-language films